Bikanervala is an Indian restaurant chain headquartered in Delhi, that specializes in Indian sweets, snacks. Founded 115 years ago as a sweets and namkeen shop called Lalji in Bikaner, Rajasthan.
It was established in Delhi almost seven decades ago. The brand is now worth Rs 1,300 crore (US$ 178 Million). It is one of India's largest restaurant chain with 94 locations both in India and globally.

History 

In 1950 two members of the Lalji family moved to Delhi to explore new avenues for expanding their traditional business. Initially the Aggarwal brothers set up a stall in Chandni Chowk by the name of Bikaner Bhujia Bhandar in Paranthe Wali Gali. In the 1960s, they increased their line of products by including more varieties of traditional sweets and namkeens, and opened several shops as Bikanervala in prominent parts of Delhi, including Karol Bagh.
The present Managing Director of Bikanervala Foods Pvt Ltd, Shyam Sundar Aggarwal, joined the family business in 1968. Then 16, he had just finished high school. Learning the art of making sweets from his father.
In 1980s, when the western fast-food pizza entered the Indian market, Aggarwal realized that there was scope to explore more Indian products thus Bikanervala opened several outlets in various parts of the country.
In 1988, to take the brand globally, they launched Bikano to sell sweets and namkeens in air-tight packaging. In 1995, Bikanervala entered into an exclusive agreement to produce namkeens for PepsiCo’s brand Lehar, opening a new plant in Faridabad, Haryana.

While Bikanervala's packaged food products, including sweets and namkeens, are sold under the Bikano brand name, the company has opened  Bikano Chat Cafes  (2003) which are quick service restaurants serving fast food with minimal table service.
The Bikanervala and  Angan  restaurants serve traditional Indian snacks, sweets and namkeens.
Bikanervala has also launched a boutique hotel at Banjara Hills in Hyderabad.

Outlets/Manufacturing Units 
In India, the company has 42 outlets in Delhi NCR alone. while it has as many as 12 outlets in UAE and 7 in Nepal. Bikanervala is also present in New Zealand and Singapore and the US (two outlets each).

Manufacturing is based in Delhi, Noida (Uttar Pradesh), Faridabad and Rai (in Haryana).

Lawsuit 
In 2012 the company was charged with selling adulterated products, but acquitted.

Exports 

Bikano products are exported to nearly 30 countries including Nepal, Pakistan, US, Canada, UK, Australia, New Zealand, UAE, Qatar, Kuwait, Oman, Saudi Arabia, Italy, Spain, the Netherlands, Denmark, Norway, Sweden, South Korea, Thailand, Hong Kong, the Philippines and Singapore and South Africa.

Brands 
 Bikanervala
 Bikano
 Bikano Chat Cafe
 Angan

Awards 
Brand has been awarded the accolade of the Best Sweet Shops in Delhi for 2012, 2013 and 2014 by Times Food Award.

See also
 List of vegetarian and vegan companies
 Bikanervala Franchise Opportunity in India

References

Confectionery companies of India
Companies based in New Delhi
Fast-food chains of India
Food and drink companies established in 1950
Vegetarian companies and establishments
1950 establishments in India